Mariano Acosta (born 7 July 1930) is an Argentine sprinter. He competed in the men's 100 metres at the 1952 Summer Olympics.

References

External links
 

1930 births
Possibly living people
Athletes (track and field) at the 1952 Summer Olympics
Argentine male sprinters
Olympic athletes of Argentina
Place of birth missing (living people)
Pan American Games medalists in athletics (track and field)
Pan American Games bronze medalists for Argentina
Athletes (track and field) at the 1951 Pan American Games
Medalists at the 1951 Pan American Games
20th-century Argentine people